Martyanovo is the name of several rural localities in Russia.

Modern localities

Ivanovo Oblast
As of 2012, one rural locality in Ivanovo Oblast bears this name:
Martyanovo, Ivanovo Oblast, a village in Ilyinsky District

Kostroma Oblast
As of 2012, one rural locality in Kostroma Oblast bears this name:
Martyanovo, Chukhlomsky District, Kostroma Oblast, a village in Sudayskoye Settlement of Chukhlomsky District;

Moscow Oblast
As of 2012, two rural localities in Moscow Oblast bear this name:
Martyanovo, Odintsovsky District, Moscow Oblast, a village in Nikolskoye Rural Settlement of Odintsovsky District
Martyanovo, Serpukhovsky District, Moscow Oblast, a village in Dankovskoye Rural Settlement of Serpukhovsky District

Nizhny Novgorod Oblast
As of 2012, one rural locality in Nizhny Novgorod Oblast bears this name:
Martyanovo, Nizhny Novgorod Oblast, a village in Vladimirsky Selsoviet of Voskresensky District

Oryol Oblast
As of 2012, one rural locality in Oryol Oblast bears this name:
Martyanovo, Oryol Oblast, a village in Soskovsky Selsoviet of Soskovsky District

Perm Krai
As of 2012, two rural localities in Perm Krai bear this name:
Martyanovo, Permsky District, Perm Krai, a village in Permsky District
Martyanovo, Suksunsky District, Perm Krai, a village in Suksunsky District

Pskov Oblast
As of 2012, three rural localities in Pskov Oblast bear this name:
Martyanovo, Kunyinsky District, Pskov Oblast, a village in Kunyinsky District
Martyanovo, Loknyansky District, Pskov Oblast, a village in Loknyansky District
Martyanovo, Velikoluksky District, Pskov Oblast, a village in Velikoluksky District

Sverdlovsk Oblast
As of 2012, one rural locality in Sverdlovsk Oblast bears this name:
Martyanovo, Sverdlovsk Oblast, a village in Shalinsky District

Tver Oblast
As of 2012, one rural locality in Tver Oblast bears this name:
Martyanovo, Tver Oblast, a village in Staritsa Rural Settlement of Staritsky District

Vologda Oblast
As of 2012, two rural localities in Vologda Oblast bear this name:
Martyanovo, Cherepovetsky District, Vologda Oblast, a village in Batransky Selsoviet of Cherepovetsky District
Martyanovo, Vologodsky District, Vologda Oblast, a village in Kubensky Selsoviet of Vologodsky District

Yaroslavl Oblast
As of 2012, three rural localities in Yaroslavl Oblast bear this name:
Martyanovo, Lyubimsky District, Yaroslavl Oblast, a village in Troitsky Rural Okrug of Lyubimsky District
Martyanovo, Poshekhonsky District, Yaroslavl Oblast, a village in Gayutinsky Rural Okrug of Poshekhonsky District
Martyanovo, Rybinsky District, Yaroslavl Oblast, a village in Pogorelsky Rural Okrug of Rybinsky District

Abolished localities
Martyanovo, Parfenyevsky District, Kostroma Oblast, a village in Matveyevsky Selsoviet of Parfenyevsky District in Kostroma Oblast; abolished on October 18, 2004

References

Notes

Sources